, translit. Mi Rotze Lihyot Milyoner?, is an Israeli game show based on the original British format of Who Wants to Be a Millionaire?. The show started broadcasting in 1999 on Channel 2 with Yoram Arbel as host, and moved to Channel 10 in 2006. It returned in 2020 on Channel 12 with Erez Tal, who had guest hosted an episode in 2003.

The main goal of the game was to win ₪1,000,000 by answering 15 multiple-choice questions correctly. Contestants who answered their fifth question correctly won at least ₪1000, and those who answered their tenth question correctly won at least ₪32,000.

One contestant, Izhar Nevo, has won the top prize, on 7 August 2000.  Nevo used his final lifeline, 50/50, on the last question and when still unsure of the answer tossed a coin to pick from the remaining two to win the top prize.

Payout structure

References

Who Wants to Be a Millionaire?
Israeli reality television series
Channel 2 (Israeli TV channel) original programming
1999 Israeli television series debuts
2007 Israeli television series endings

he:מי רוצה להיות מיליונר?#הגרסה הישראלית